Dylan Chowles Unsworth (born 23 September 1992) is a South African professional baseball pitcher who is a free agent. He previously played for the Fubon Guardians of the Chinese Professional Baseball League (CPBL), and also pitches for the South African national baseball team.

Career

Seattle Mariners
Unsworth attended the European Baseball Academy in Italy in 2009, where he was discovered and signed by the Seattle Mariners on June 20, 2010. In 2010 in the Rookie League he was 2–5 with a 3.93 ERA in 50.1 innings (in which he allowed only one walk). In 2011 in 12 starts in the Rookie League he was 6–5 with a 5.16 ERA in 61.0 innings.

In 2012 in 14 starts in Class A (Short) he was 7–2 with a 3.90 ERA in 85.1 innings. In 2013 he pitched for two teams in 14 starts in the Rookie League and Class A and was 4–1 with a 2.50 ERA in 72.0 innings (in which he allowed only two walks), and was a mid-season All Star in the Midwest League. According to Baseball America, in 2013 he was the top control pitcher in the Mariners system. In 2014 in 26 starts in Class A+ he was 6–9 with a 5.88 ERA.

In 2015, for two minor league teams in Class A+ and Class AA he was 5–10 with a 3.95 ERA in 107.0 innings. In 2016, he pitched in 9 starts for the Jackson Generals of the Class AA Southern League, and was 3–1 with a 1.16 ERA in 46.2 innings despite his fastball not reaching 90 miles per hour, and a mid-season Southern League All Star, and had his season cut short by a hamstring injury. He was named to appear in the 2016 All-Star Futures Game. He pitched in 22 starts for the Tacoma Rainiers of the Class AAA Pacific Coast League and the Arkansas Travelers of the Class AA Texas League in 2017, and was a combined 9–9 with a 3.30 ERA in 128.1 innings. He became a free agent on November 6, 2017.

Los Angeles Angels
On January 17, 2018, Unsworth signed a minor league contract with the Los Angeles Angels. Pitching in Class AA with the Mobile BayBears and Class AAA with the Salt Lake Bees in 2018, he was a combined 6–4 with a 5.75 ERA in 103.1 innings in 15 starts and 9 relief appearances. On November 2, 2018, he became a free agent.

Through 2018, in the minor leagues he was 48–46	with a 4.17 ERA, as in 773.1 innings he gave up 847 hits (9.9 per 9 innings) and 121 walks (1.4 per 9 innings) while striking out 625 batters (7.3 per 9 innings). He is known for not overpowering batters with velocity, but rather relying on a good changeup and excellent control.

El Águila de Veracruz
On February 11, 2020, Unsworth signed with the Pericos de Puebla of the Mexican League. However, he did not pitch with the team as the season was canceled due to the COVID-19 pandemic.

On February 18, 2021, Unsworth signed with El Águila de Veracruz of the Mexican League for the 2021 season. On May 28, Unsworth threw a no-hitter against the Diablos Rojos del México. In 8 appearances with Veracruz, Unsworth recorded a 4–0 record and 2.57 ERA with 27 strikeouts in 42.0 innings of work.

Fubon Guardians
On July 22, 2021, Unsworth signed with the Fubon Guardians of the Chinese Professional Baseball League (CPBL). Unsworth made his CPBL debut on November 6. He became a free agent following the season.

El Águila de Veracruz (second stint)
On January 21, 2022, Unsworth signed with El Águila de Veracruz of the Mexican League. He was released on May 25, 2022, after suffering a knee injury that would keep him out for several weeks.

International career
As a member of the South African national baseball team, Unsworth competed in the 2009 Baseball World Cup, 2013 World Baseball Classic Qualification, and the 2017 World Baseball Classic Qualification.

He competed at the Africa/Europe 2020 Olympic Qualification tournament in Italy in September 2019.

References

External links

1992 births
Living people
Arizona League Mariners players
Arkansas Travelers players
Baseball pitchers
Bakersfield Blaze players
Clinton LumberKings players
El Águila de Veracruz players
Everett AquaSox players
Fubon Guardians players
High Desert Mavericks players
Jackson Generals (Southern League) players
Leones del Caracas players
Mobile BayBears players
Peoria Javelinas players
Pulaski Mariners players
Salt Lake Bees players
South African expatriate baseball players in the United States
Sportspeople from Durban
Tacoma Rainiers players
White South African people
South African expatriate baseball players in Australia
Expatriate baseball players in Venezuela
Expatriate baseball players in Taiwan
Expatriate baseball players in Mexico